Prachi Deshpande (born 14 December 1972) is an Indian historian and Associate Professor in History at Centre for Studies in Social Sciences, Calcutta.

Education
Deshpande completed her undergraduate and post graduate education in History at Fergusson College, Pune and Jawaharlal Nehru University, New Delhi respectively before moving to the United States to pursue her PhD from Tufts University, Medford, MA.

Career 
Post her doctoral education at Tufts University, MA in 2002, Deshpande served as an assistant professor at several institutions in the United States including Colorado State University (2002 - 2004), Rutgers University (2004 - 2006), University of California, Berkeley (2006–2010). In 2010, she returned to India to take up her present position at the Centre for Studies in Social Sciences in Kolkata.

Publications 
Deshpande has publications both in Marathi and English. Her book, Creative Pasts: Historical Memory and Identity in Western India, 1700-1960 (2007) explores modern history writing practices in Marathi-speaking parts of Western India and its impact on shaping Maharashtrian regional identity. Her other notable academic work include 'Scripting the Cultural History of Language: Modi in the Colonial Archive'  and 'The writerly self: Literacy, discipline and codes of conduct in early modern western India (2016)'.
 Creative Pasts: Historical Memory and Identity in Western India, 1700-1960 (2007)
 Shuddhalekhan Orthography, Community and the Marathi Public Sphere (2016)
 The writerly self: Literacy, discipline and codes of conduct in early modern western India (2016)

Awards 
In 2020, Deshpande received the Infosys Prize for Humanities – History for her extraordinarily nuanced and highly sophisticated treatment of South Asian historiography.

References 

1972 births
Living people
21st-century Indian historians
Fergusson College alumni
Jawaharlal Nehru University alumni
Tufts University alumni
Colorado State University faculty
University of California, Berkeley faculty